Waldemar Franciszek Andzel (born 17 September 1971) is a Polish politician.

Biography
He was born in Czeladź and was elected to the Sejm on 25 September 2005, getting 4,257 votes in 32 Sosnowiec district as a candidate from the Law and Justice list.

See also
Members of Polish Sejm 2005-2007

External links
Waldemar Andzel - parliamentary page - includes declarations of interest, voting record, and transcripts of speeches.

1971 births
Living people
People from Czeladź
Law and Justice politicians
Members of the Polish Sejm 2005–2007
Members of the Polish Sejm 2007–2011
Members of the Polish Sejm 2011–2015
Members of the Polish Sejm 2015–2019
Members of the Polish Sejm 2019–2023
University of Silesia in Katowice alumni